Pulp Literature Press is a Canadian-based small press founded in Richmond, BC in 2013.  The primary work of the press is the publication of the quarterly literary journal, Pulp Literature. In 2016, the press expanded into publishing writing guides, and added full-length novels in 2017.

Publications

Pulp Literature 

Pulp Literature is a Canadian quarterly literary journal that features the work of emerging and established writers. Launched in Richmond, BC in 2013, Pulp Literature publishes and promotes short fiction, poetry, art (including graphic novel short stories), and feature interviews. The journal has an affirmative action policy for submissions and publishes at least 75% Canadian content. Pulp Literature is distributed in print and electronic format throughout Canada, and to an international readership.
 2014 - Issues 1-4
 2015 - Issue 5-8
 2016 - Issues 9-12
 2017 - Issues 13-16
 2018 - Issues 17-20

History 
In 2013, Pulp Literature magazine was founded on Bowen Island. The journal's title came from the founding editors’ taste for great storytelling in genre fiction. The word 'Pulp' is an homage to pulp publications such as The Magazine of Fantasy & Science Fiction, Analog, Ellery Queen, etc., while ‘Literature’ represents the ideal of narrative quality.

Notable contributors 
Each issue features a story from a well-known author writing outside their usual genres. These include C.C. Humphreys, JJ Lee (writer), Joan MacLeod, Susanna Kearsley, George McWhirter, Matt Hughes, Eileen Kernaghan, Robert J. Sawyer, Carol Berg, Brenda Carre, Bob Thurber, and Matthew Hooton.

Novels 

2017
 Stella Ryman and the Fairmount Manor Mysteries
 Allaigna’s Song: Overture

2018 (forthcoming)
 Advent
 Stella Ryman and the Mystery of the Mah-Jongg Box

Writing Guides et al. 
2016
 Colouring Paradise: A Renaissance-Inspired Colouring Book
 The Writer’s Boon Companion: Thirty Days Towards an Extraordinary Volume
2018 (forthcoming)
 The Writer’s Friend & Confidante

Writing contests 
Pulp Literature runs four annual contests for fiction and poetry that supplement the magazine’s income and provide cash prizes up to $500 and publication for the winners. Judges for these contests have included George McWhirter, C.C. Humphreys, JJ Lee, Bob Thurber, Brenda Carre, Diane Tucker, and Renée Sarojini Saklikar.
 The Bumblebee Flash Fiction Contest (originally the Bumblebee Microfiction Award) - est 2015
 The Magpie Award for Poetry - est 2014
 The Hummingbird Flash Fiction Prize - est 2014
 The Raven Short Story Contest (originally the Raven Cover Story Contest) - est 2015
Raven Winners
 2019 Michael Donoghue for ‘Life4Sale’
 2018 Cheryl Wollner for ‘Girls Who Dance in the Flames’
 2017 Elaine McDivitt for ‘The Tape’
 2016 Pat Flewwelling for ‘The Handler’ 
 2015 Emily Linstrom for ‘Black Blizzard’

References

External links 
 http://pulpliterature.com

Literary magazines published in Canada
Magazines published in Vancouver
Quarterly magazines published in Canada
Magazines established in 2013